

Final standings

ACC tournament
See 1958 ACC men's basketball tournament

NCAA tournament

Round of 24
Maryland 86, Boston College 63

Regional semi-finals
Temple 71, Maryland 67

Regional third-place
Maryland 59, Manhattan 55

ACC's NCAA record
2–1

NIT
League rules prevented ACC teams from playing in the NIT, 1954–1966